Bardh i Madh is a village in the municipality of Fushë Kosovë, in Kosovo.

Notes

References 

Villages in Kosovo Polje